Phycodopteryx is a genus of moths in the family Brachodidae. It contains the single species Phycodopteryx tigripes, which is found in Vietnam and India (Assam). The habitat consists of submontane tropical forests.

The wingspan is 25–30 mm for females and 23–25 mm for males. The forewings are black with irregular grey bands. The hindwings are black, with a broad, white subbasal band. Adults have been recorded on wing from early May to early June, probably in one generation per year.

Etymology
The genus name refers to the similarity of the type species with the genus Phycodes. The species name refers to the forewing markings, which resemble those of a tiger’s leg.

References

Brachodidae